Francis Courtenay (c. 1650 – 12 May 1699) was an English Member of Parliament.

He represented Devonshire in the House of Commons from 1689 to 1699. He was the son of Sir William Courtenay, 1st Baronet and the father of Sir William Courtenay, 2nd Baronet.

References
 
 https://web.archive.org/web/20171011182617/http://www.leighrayment.com/commons/Dcommons2.htm

1699 deaths
1650s births
Year of birth uncertain
Members of the Parliament of England (pre-1707) for Devon
Place of birth missing
English MPs 1689–1690
English MPs 1690–1695
English MPs 1695–1698
English MPs 1698–1700
Heirs apparent who never acceded